Troed-y-rhiw-Sion is a hamlet in the  community of Beulah, Ceredigion, Wales, which is 69.3 miles (111.6 km) from Cardiff and 190.9 miles (307.2 km) from London. Troed-y-rhiw-Sion is represented in the Senedd by Elin Jones (Plaid Cymru) and is part of the Ceredigion constituency in the House of Commons.

See also
 List of localities in Wales by population

References

Villages in Ceredigion